Blizhneye Stoyanovo is a rural locality (a khutor) in Gnilovskoye Rural Settlement, Ostrogozhsky District, Voronezh Oblast, Russia. The population was 580 as of 2010. There are 9 streets.

Geography 
Blizhneye Stoyanovo is located 8 km south of Ostrogozhsk (the district's administrative centre) by road. Gniloye is the nearest rural locality.

References 

Rural localities in Ostrogozhsky District